We Wish You a Merry Christmas is a Christmas-centric budget title for Wii.  The party game features 5 minigames to play including Candy Cane Lanes, Present Catch, and Elf Hunt.  It also includes an in-game Advent calendar.  The player can also write letters to Santa and sing Christmas Carols.  Up to four players can join in on the game.

Reception
Worthplaying gave the game a 4.0/10 saying that the title was "very difficult [...] to recommend" on account of the fact that there wern't "many activities to partake in, and only a few of the included ones [were] any fun" adding that there were "definitely better compilations that are more deserving of your hard-earned money."

References

External links
 

2009 video games
Christmas video games
Wii-only games
Party video games
Wii games
Multiplayer and single-player video games
Video games developed in the United States